Gurpreet Singh Kangar is an Indian politician from Punjab, India. He was a member of Punjab Legislative Assembly and was also a minister in Second Amarinder Singh ministry. He had won the assembly election as a member of Indian National Congress. 

He joined Bhartiya Janta Party on 4 June 2022 along with Raj Kumar Verka, Balbir Singh Sidhu, Sundar Sham Arora, and others at the party office in Chandigarh.

References 

Punjab, India MLAs 2017–2022
State cabinet ministers of Punjab, India
Former members of Indian National Congress from Punjab
Living people
1966 births
Bharatiya Janata Party politicians from Punjab